Denis Island is the second northeasternmost island in the Seychelles. The  coral island was named after the French Navy officer Denis de Trobriand, who explored it in 1773. Denis Island is privately owned and has a short airstrip. It has a holiday resort with 23 guest chalets.

A lighthouse built in 1910 still stands on the northern edge of the island. There is also a chapel named Chapel St. Denis.

The island has an abundance of coconut palms, Takamaka and Casuarina trees. In 2004, 47 Seychelles fodies from Fregate Island and 58 Seychelles warblers from Cousin Island were relocated to Denis as part of a Nature Seychelles conservation project.

The island has been designated a cay, in the Seychelles Archipelago.

See also
List of lighthouses in Seychelles

Gallery

References

External links
 IUCN Relocation Project
 Denis Island Resort
 Google Maps

Islands of La Digue and Inner Islands
Important Bird Areas of Seychelles
Lighthouses in Seychelles
Private islands of Seychelles